Akornion was an important citizen of the Ionian Greek colony of Dionysopolis (today's Balchik, on the Black Sea coast of Bulgaria).

He is mentioned in the Decree of Dionysopolis, written around 48 BC by the citizens of the polis. The decree mentions that Akornion  was sent far away in a diplomatic mission to meet somebody's father in Argedauon, potentially the Dacian towns of Argidava or Argedava. The decree, a fragmentary marble inscription, is located in the National Historical Museum in Sofia, Bulgaria.

The inscription also refers to the Dacian king Burebista, and one interpretation is that Akornion was his chief adviser (literally "first friend") in Dionysopolis. Other sources indicate that Akornion was sent as an ambassador of Burebista to Pompey, to discuss an alliance against Julius Caesar.

See also 
 Dionysopolis
 Burebista
 Dacia

Notes

References

External links 

 Searchable Greek Inscriptions at The Packard Humanities Institute (PHI)  - Segment from Decree of Dionysopolis reviewed in Inscriptiones graecae in Bulgaria repertae by Georgi Mihailov

1st-century BC Greek people
People from Balchik
Dacia